Gary Stretch (born 4 November 1965) is a British Actor, Model, Producer, Screenwriter, British & WBC Boxing Champion. During his boxing career, Stretch won 29 of his 31 fights, 20 of those by KO. He became the WBC International Super Welterweight Champion.

In his modelling career, Stretch modelled for high-end brands including Calvin Klein and Versace. During his acting career, he starred in such films as The Heavy (directed by Marcus Warren) and Alexander (directed by Oliver Stone). He was also cast in the Shane Meadows’ film Dead Man’s Shoes as the small-time gang leader, Sonny, for which role he was nominated for a British Independent Film Award for Best Supporting Actor.

Early life 
Stretch was born in 1965 and brought up in the Haresfinch area of St Helens, Lancashire. His father was a plumber. He attended the town's Cowley High School.

Career

Boxing 

A southpaw fighter, Stretch boxed most of his career as a light-middleweight, rising to become British champion in that division.

He won the WBC International Light Middleweight title, beating Ramon Angel Alegre at the London Arena on 14 February 1990, the fight billed as Valentine's Day Massacre. Stretch, aged 24, stopped the Argentine in the 6th round of a very one sided contest. Stretch relinquished the title due to a management dispute with Frank Warren and subsequently sat out his contract.

Stretch's return to the ring came in 1991 when he challenged Chris Eubank for the WBO world middleweight championship in London, in a fight billed as "Beauty V the Best". Stretch suffered a cut behind the ear in the first round and was shaken by an uppercut in the third. Eubank visited the canvas twice in the fight without a count, in the second and third rounds, and was cut badly in the fourth round by a straight left hand from Stretch. The doctor was called at the end of round 5 to look at Eubank (the cut later needed several stitches), advising the referee to stop the fight. The referee gave the Eubank corner the go ahead for "one more round". In the sixth round Stretch had a point deducted for pushing Eubank onto the canvas; Stretch was shaken by a right hand from Eubank and subsequently took a standing eight count. Stretch was then pushed through the ropes. The fight was stopped in Eubank's favor, a stoppage that was controversial. Stretch was through the ropes, struggling to regain his feet when the referee stepped in. All three judges had Stretch ahead on the scorecard at the time of the stoppage.

Stretch fought only once more after his bout with Eubank before retiring with a career record of 29 wins 1 loss and 1 NC (an accidental clash of heads causing Stretch to be cut on the forehead).

Modelling 
During his time as a boxer, Stretch also worked as a model. His clients included Calvin Klein and Versace.

Acting 
Stretch was cast as Cleitus alongside Anthony Hopkins, Colin Farrell and Angelina Jolie in Oliver Stone's 2004 film Alexander. Stone went on to cast Stretch again in World Trade Center as a paramedic, and in Savages. In 2004, Stretch was cast as psychopathic gangster Sonny in Shane Meadows' gritty cult thriller Dead Man's Shoes (2004), for which Stretch received a BIFA nomination alongside fellow English actor Paddy Considine. 

Stretch also starred in Freebird in 2008, directed by Jon Ivay. With Stretch appearing alongside Phil Daniels and Geoff Bell, the film followed three bikers across a drug-fueled ride in the Welsh countryside.

Personal life 
From 1998 to 2001, Stretch was married to actress Roselyn Sánchez.

Filmography 
Tis a Gift to Be Simple (1994) ... Perry Truman
Final Combination (1994) ... Richard Welton
Infidelity/Hard Fall (1997) ... Shane
Business for Pleasure (1997) ... Rolf
Shergar (1999) ... SAS Soldier
Dead Dogs Lie (2001) ... Duck
Final Combat (2003) ... Jaikra
A Good Night to Die (2003) ... Ronnie
Dead Man's Shoes (2004) ... Sonny
Alexander (2004) ... Cleitus
The King Maker (2005) ... Fernando De Gamma
World Trade Center (2006) ... John's Paramedic
The Commander: Windows of the Soul (2007) ... Jack Bannerman
Afghan Knights (2007) ... Nash
Tied in Knots (2008) ... Jay
Freebird (2008) ... Fred
Deadwater (2008) ... Colin Willets
The Heavy (2010) ... Mitchell 'Boots' Mason
Baseline (2010) ... Rob
Mega Shark Versus Crocosaurus (2010)
Yellow
The Girl from the Naked Eye (2012) ... Frank
The Pugilist's Son (short) (2012) ... Terry Hope
Savages (2013) ... Bad Ass Biker
My Father Die ... Ivan

References

External links 
Gary Stretch's website

1965 births
English male boxers
English male film actors
Living people
Sportspeople from St Helens, Merseyside
Light-middleweight boxers
English male models